St James Park is a name used for a suburb in north-eastern Hamilton in New Zealand by a 2010 map. It was developed by Chedworth/Grasshopper Joint Venture in 2001. In 2012 Hamilton Libraries described it as being in Huntington, as do some valuers and land agents. St James shopping area is in the centre of Rototuna, with a Countdown supermarket, a gym and a Palmers Garden Centre.

Demographics

St James had a population of 1,938 at the 2018 New Zealand census, an increase of 228 people (13.3%) since the 2013 census, and an increase of 909 people (88.3%) since the 2006 census. There were 576 households, comprising 960 males and 978 females, giving a sex ratio of 0.98 males per female. The median age was 35.2 years (compared with 37.4 years nationally), with 501 people (25.9%) aged under 15 years, 336 (17.3%) aged 15 to 29, 912 (47.1%) aged 30 to 64, and 189 (9.8%) aged 65 or older.

Ethnicities were 70.6% European/Pākehā, 10.2% Māori, 2.0% Pacific peoples, 24.9% Asian, and 2.9% other ethnicities. People may identify with more than one ethnicity.

The percentage of people born overseas was 33.1, compared with 27.1% nationally.

Although some people chose not to answer the census's question about religious affiliation, 47.8% had no religion, 37.5% were Christian, 3.1% were Hindu, 2.2% were Muslim, 1.4% were Buddhist and 1.7% had other religions.

Of those at least 15 years old, 525 (36.5%) people had a bachelor's or higher degree, and 147 (10.2%) people had no formal qualifications. The median income was $39,300, compared with $31,800 nationally. 402 people (28.0%) earned over $70,000 compared to 17.2% nationally. The employment status of those at least 15 was that 816 (56.8%) people were employed full-time, 228 (15.9%) were part-time, and 42 (2.9%) were unemployed.

References

See also
 Suburbs of Hamilton, New Zealand

Suburbs of Hamilton, New Zealand